Abū Hafs Sirāj al-Dīn al-Bulqīnī(1324–1403 CE); also known as just Sirajuddin al-Bulqini was an Egyptian scholar of Islamic Jurisprudence. Regarded as the leading Shafi'i jurist and mujtahid of his time. He is a prominent scholar of the famous al-Bulqīnī family, which was an influential dynasty of Shāfiʿī judges, law professors, and administrators in Mamlūk Syria and Egypt. They were renowned for being the house of knowledge, virtue, leadership and generosity.

Biography

Early
He was born in the August 4th of 1324 CE. He memorized the Noble Qur’an when he was seven years old, which was a young age that only a few scholars ever did. He also memorized “Al-Muharir” in jurisprudence, “Al-Kafi” in grammar by Ibn Malik , and Mukhtasar Ibn Al-Hajib in Usul al-Fiqh and “Al-Shatibiyyah” in readings, and many other famous Islamic science books. His hometown is called Bulqini. It is said that the third grandfather of Siraj al-Din, was the first to reside in Bulqini, and that is why he was nicknamed Al-Bulqini which is a village belonging to the center of al-Mahalla al-Kubra, Gharbia Governorate  on Tanta Road.

Moving to Cairo
His father brought him to Cairo when he was twelve years old. So he sought knowledge and studied under the scholars of his time, he studied under Sheikh Al-Maidumi, Sheikh Shams al-Din, Sheikh Al-Isfahani, others and most prominently Sheikh al-Islam Taqi al-Din al-Subki. He was authorized to issue fatwas when he was just ten years old. 

He surpassed his peers and colleagues, and the conditions of jurisprudence met in the correct manner. It was said that he was a “renewer of the ninth century AH”, and his elders and colleagues praised him as a young man, and the study of science ended with him in the countries of the earth. Scholars and students came to him from every direction, and fatwas came to him from every side.

Judge
After his primary education in Egypt. He assumed several positions, including the fatwa of the House of Justice, and he travelled to Damascus and was appointed as a Mufti in the year 769 AH, where he worked for a short period, then returned.

Teaching and students
He has also served as a lecturer at Al-Azhar Mosque. He had a vast number of disciples that the entire Egypt following the Shafi`i school had Ulama who were either his own disciples or disciples of his disciples.

His most popular students were:
 Siraj al-Din Omar al-Balqini, his son who was the teacher of Al-Suyuti and Zakariyya al-Ansari
 Ibn Hajar Al-Asqalani
 Badr al-Din al-Ayni
 Jalal ad-Din al-Mahalli
 Ibn Nasir al-Dimishqi
 Burhan al-Din al-Muhaddith

Death
Imam Siraj al-Din al-Bulqini passed away on Friday the 1st of June in the year 1403 CE. His son, Jalal Al-Din, prayed for him and was buried in his school after a long life that he spent in the service of Islam and its sciences. His student Ibn Hajar and others mourned him with long poems. Ibn Hajar al-Asqalani says at the beginning of it:

"Oh eye Judy to lose the sea with rain
I know the tears do not remain and do not shed
I spend my day in them and in grief
and the length of my night thinking and staying up late
and my heart dived into the sea of worries either
you see shed tears of it Kaldarr
God's mercy and contentment includes it
safety is not worn out crying for my life
manar Al-Din has set up clear
his lamp lit the universe for mankind
if Ibn Idris saw him, the imam authorized
read and read his eyes from him by looking
so he achieved how many extensions he had by conquest
achieving the hope of the Prophet of God in Omar."

Works
 Tashih al-Minhaj, an explanation of Al-Nawawi's Minhaj al-Talibin.
 Sharh al Tirmidhi, commentary on Sahih al-Tirmidhi
 Musabah al Manahij
 Litashih Almurajaea
 Bidayatan Bikitab Aldhabihat Wantha'an Bikitab Alshahadat

References

Asharis
Shafi'is
Shaykh al-Islāms
Mujaddid
Egyptian imams
Egyptian Sunni Muslims
Egyptian Sufis
Egyptian theologians
Sunni Muslim scholars of Islam
Sunni imams
Shafi'i fiqh scholars
15th-century Egyptian people
15th-century jurists
1324 births
1403 deaths
Supporters of Ibn Arabi